The men's sabre was one of eight fencing events on the fencing at the 1976 Summer Olympics programme. It was the eighteenth appearance of the event. The competition was held from July 21 to 22, 1976. 46 fencers from 18 nations competed. Nations had been limited to three fencers each since 1928. The event was won by Viktor Krovopuskov of the Soviet Union, the nation's second consecutive victory in the men's sabre. The Soviet Union's two gold medals in the event moved it out of a six-way tie into sole possession of second place all-time, after Hungary with 11. The Soviet team swept the men's sabre medals in 1976, with Vladimir Nazlymov taking silver and Viktor Sidyak bronze. It was the third sweep in the event (Hungary accomplished it in 1912 and 1952). Nazlymov and Sidyak were the eighth and ninth men to win multiple medals in the event. Excluding matches against each other, the three Soviets went 48–3 during the tournament. For the first time since 1900, Hungary competed in the men's sabre but did not win a medal (did not compete in 1904 or 1920, medaled in 1908, 1912, and for eleven straight Games from 1924 to 1972).

Background

This was the 18th appearance of the event, which is the only fencing event to have been held at every Summer Olympics. All six of the finalists from 1972 returned: gold medalist Viktor Sidyak of the Soviet Union, silver medalist Péter Marót of Hungary, bronze medalist Vladimir Nazlymov of the Soviet Union, fourth-place finisher Michele Maffei of Italy, fifth-place finisher Régis Bonissent of France, and sixth-place finisher Tamás Kovács of Hungary. Nazlymov was the reigning (1975) world champion, Mario Aldo Montano of Italy had won the two before him (1973 and 1974). Hungary was no longer the sabre power it once was, having been surpassed by the Soviet Union, though (along with Poland and Italy) continued to be among the perennial contenders.

Paraguay and Thailand each made their debut in the men's sabre. Italy made its 16th appearance in the event, most of any nation, having missed the inaugural 1896 event and the 1904 Olympics.

Competition format

The 1976 tournament returned to a mix of pool and knockout rounds similar to that used in 1968, after the 1972 edition briefly used a pool-only format. The competition included three pool rounds, followed by a double-elimination knockout round, finishing with a final pool round. In each pool round, the fencers competed in a round-robin.

Bouts in the round-robin pools were to 5 touches; bouts in the double-elimination round were to 10 touches. Repechages were not used in the first three rounds, but were used to determine medalists if necessary in the final.

Schedule

All times are Eastern Daylight Time (UTC-4)

Results

Round 1

Round 1 Pool A

Round 1 Pool B

Round 1 Pool C

Round 1 Pool D

Round 1 Pool E

Round 1 Pool F

Round 1 Pool G

Round 1 Pool H

Round 1 Pool I

Round 2

Round 2 Pool A

Round 2 Pool B

Round 2 Pool C

Round 2 Pool D

Round 2 Pool E

Round 2 Pool F

Round 3

Round 3 Pool A

Round 3 Pool B

Round 3 Pool C

Round 3 Pool D

Double elimination rounds

Winners brackets

Winners group 1

Winners group 2

Winners group 3

Winners group 4

Losers brackets

Losers group 1

Losers group 2

Final round

Final classification

References

Sabre men
Men's events at the 1976 Summer Olympics